Bédeille is a commune in the Ariège department of southwestern France.

Population
Inhabitants of Bédeille are called Bédeillais in French.

See also
Communes of the Ariège department

References

External links
(French) History of Ariege - Bédeille

Communes of Ariège (department)
Ariège communes articles needing translation from French Wikipedia